The 1913 Delaware Fightin' Blue Hens football team was an American football team that represented Delaware College (later renamed the University of Delaware) as an independent during the 1913 college football season. In its sixth season under head coach William McAvoy, the team compiled a 2–4–2 record and was outscored by a total of 82 to 55.  William F. Cann was the team captain. 

The 1914 season was the first for Delaware at the newly-constructed Frazer Field, known at the time as Joe Frazer Field. The field was built at an estimated cost of $30,000 and included "a handsome memorial gate costing $5,000, in memory of Joseph Frazer." Frazer was an alumnus of Delaware College who became wealthy building a railroad in Bolivia, where he died.

Schedule

References

Delaware
Delaware Fightin' Blue Hens football seasons
Delaware Fightin' Blue Hens football